Saphenista pyrczi is a species of moth of the family Tortricidae. It is found in Napo Province, Ecuador.

The wingspan is about 24 mm. The ground colour of the forewings is cream, tinged and sprinkled with brown and with brownish suffusions. The hindwings are brownish cream, but browner in the apex area and on the periphery.

Etymology
The species is named for Dr. Tomasz Pyrcz.

References

Moths described in 2009
Saphenista